Meganola albula, the Kent black arches, is a moth of the family Nolidae. The species was first described by Michael Denis and Ignaz Schiffermüller in 1775. It is found in the Palearctic realm (Europe, Asia Minor, Iran, Caucasus, Russian Far East, Japan).

The wingspan is 18–24 mm. The length of the forewings is 10–11 mm. The moth flies in one generation from mid-June to August .

The larvae feed on Rubus, Fragaria vesca and Vaccinium species.

Since the 19th-century, it has spread north being first recorded in England in 1859, Denmark 1938, Schleswig-Holstein 1945 and Gotland 1949

Notes
The flight season refers to Belgium and the Netherlands. This may vary in other parts of the range.

References

External links

 
 Lepidoptera of Belgium
 Lepiforum e. V.
 De Vlinderstichting. 

Nolinae
Moths described in 1775
Moths of Asia
Moths of Europe
Moths of Japan
Taxa named by Michael Denis
Taxa named by Ignaz Schiffermüller